Dinu Săraru (born 30 January 1932) is a Romanian novelist and playwright. 

He was born in Slătioara, Vâlcea County. A member of Writers' Union of Romania, he belonged to the Central Committee of the Romanian Communist Party prior to 1989, and headed Teatrul Mic and Teatrul Foarte Mic from 1977 to 1990. After the Romanian Revolution of 1989 and the fall of the communist regime, he served as chairman of the National Theatre Bucharest, being appointed in 2001 and resigning in 2004. He has claimed that his work during the communist regime was not for the purpose of glorifying dictator Nicolae Ceaușescu, but rather included subtle dissident themes.

Notes

1932 births
Living people
People from Vâlcea County
Romanian novelists
Romanian male novelists
Romanian dramatists and playwrights
Chairpersons of the National Theatre Bucharest
Male dramatists and playwrights
Romanian communists